Sirpur (T) is a town and a mandal in Komaram Bheem district of the Indian state of Telangana.

History
Sirpur, formerly known as Suryapuram, was ruled by the Gond King, Ballala. The Gond King, Bhim Ballal Sing built Sirpur Fort in 9th century AD. The modern town grew around the fort.

In 1724 AD, Nizam-e-Mulk defeated Mubariz Khan and took possession of the Deccan and began to rule. In 1773, Madhoji Bhonsle entered into an agreement with Nizam Ali Khan, Nizam of Hyderabad by which he agreed to cede Manikgarh (Rajura of Chandrapur) with surrounding territories south of Penganga to the Nizam, in return for the forts of Gavilgarh and Narnala of Amaravati district - Berar.

As a result of Third Anglo-Maratha War between the British and Raghoji II Bhonsle, the latter ceded the territory of Berar to British who, in turn, passed it on to Nizam under treaty and obligation for cooperation in war.

The area was initially a sub-district called Sirpur-Tandur carved out in 1872 and comprised Edlabad (Adilabad), Rajura (now in Maharashtra) and Sirpur taluks. Sirpur-Tandur was originally a district in Maratwada region. Later it was merged with Adilabad district of Telangana. In 2016, Komaram Bheem district was carved out of Adilabad district, and consequently, Sirpur now is in Komaram Bheem district.

Geography
Sirpur is located at 19.4833°N 79.6000°E. It has an average elevation of 184 meters (603.675 feet). It is situated on the banks of river Wardha.

Climate
All the three seasons are extreme in this region. Summer is extremely hot with temperatures exceeding 46 degrees due to the presence of Singareni Collieries nearby. December is usually the coldest month in this place with the temperature varying from 10 to 30 degrees Celsius.

Transport

The town is connected to AP SH 1 at Rebbena through a road. Sirpur is connected to many cities in Telangana by the Telangana State Road Transport Corporation bus service.

Sirpur Town railway station is located on New Delhi–Chennai main line. It is administrated by South Central Railway zone. It is the last railway station in Telangana before crossing over to Maharashtra.

The nearest airport is Nagpur Airport (242 km away) and Hyderabad Airport (323 km away).

Culture

Festivals

Dasra (Vijayadashami)
Vijayadashami is observed for different reasons and celebrated differently in various parts of South Asia. Vijayadashami marks the end of Durga Puja, remembering goddess Durga's victory over the buffalo demon Mahishasura to restore and protect dharma.[4][9] In these regions, it marks the end of "Ramlila" and remembers God Rama's victory over the Ravana. Alternatively, it marks a reverence for one of the aspects of goddess Devi such as Durga or Saraswati. Vijayadashami celebrations include processions to a river or ocean front that carry clay statues of Durga, Lakshmi, Saraswati, Ganesha and Kartikeya, accompanied by music and chants, after which the images are immersed into the water for dissolution and a goodbye. Elsewhere, on Dasara, the towering effigies of Ravana symbolizing the evil are burnt with fireworks marking evil's destruction. The festival also starts the preparation for one of the most important and widely celebrated Diwali, the festival of lights, which is celebrated twenty days after the Vijayadashami.

Bathukamma it is celebrated around the period of Dasra. This is a nine-day festival. The women participate in the bathukamma, and it is decorated with the flowers of thangadi, gunuka, thamara, chamanthi, etc. The nine days of Bathukamma are

First day: engili pulu
Second day: atukula bathukamma
Third day: muddapappu bathukamma
Fourth day: nanne biyyam bathukama
Fifth day: atla bathukamma
Sixth day: aligina bathukamma
Seventh day: vepakaya bathukamma
Eighth day: venne mudda bathukamma
Ninth day: saddula bathukamma

Pola
Pola is a bull-worshipping festival celebrated by farmers mainly in the Indian state of Maharashtra and Telangana. On the day of Pola, the farmers decorate and worship their bulls. Pola falls on the day of the Pithori Amavasya (the new moon day) in the month of Shravana (usually in August). Puran Poli, karanji, and curry with five vegetables are the main dishes associated with the festival.

Temples

 Dubbaguda Hanuman Temple
 Sirpur Balaji Temple
 Sri Ramacharla Anjaneya Swamy Devalayam
 Sri Shirdi Sai Baba Temple, Navegon
 Sri Siddi Tonkini Hanuman Temple
 Sri Venkateshwara Temple

Education
This is a list of educational institutions in Sirpur.

 Eden Garden English Medium School
 Girls Upper Primary School
 Government Junior College
 Govt. Tribal Ashrama High School
 Govt Ashram Girls School 
 MPP School, Dubbaguda
 MPUP School, Sonpet
 Social Welfare Residential School and Junior College
 Sri Sai Vidya Mandir
 Vikas Degree College
 Zilla Parishath High School

Sirpur Assembly constituency
Sirpur is an assembly constituency in Telangana.

List of Elected Members:
1978 - K.V. Keshavulu
1983 and 1989 - K.V. Narayana Rao
1989 and 1999 - Palvai Purushotham Rao
1999 - Palvai Rajyalaxmi
2004 - Koneru Konappa
2009 - Kaveti Sammaih
2010 - Kaveti Sammaih
2014 to present - Koneru Konappa

Places of interest
Sirpur Fort
Sirpur Paper Mills, Kagaznagar
Hudkuli Irrigation Project

See also
Kagaznagar
Wardha River
Pranhita River

References

Cities and towns in Komaram Bheem district
Mandals in Komaram Bheem district